Cyperus hermaphroditus, commonly known as the hermaphrodite flatsedge, is a species of sedge that is native to parts of southern parts of North America, Central America and northern parts of South America.

See also
List of Cyperus species

References

hermaphroditus
Plants described in 1916
Flora of Argentina
Flora of Arizona
Flora of Belize
Flora of Bolivia
Flora of Brazil
Flora of Colombia
Flora of Cuba
Flora of the Dominican Republic
Flora of Costa Rica
Flora of Ecuador
Flora of El Salvador
Flora of Guyana
Flora of Jamaica
Flora of Guatemala
Flora of Honduras
Flora of Panama
Flora of Mexico
Flora of Nicaragua
Flora of Peru
Flora of Texas
Flora of Venezuela
Taxa named by Paul Carpenter Standley
Flora without expected TNC conservation status